The 1933 Western State Teachers Hilltoppers football team represented Western State Teachers College (later renamed Western Michigan University) as an independent during the 1933 college football season.  In their fifth season under head coach Mike Gary, the Hilltoppers compiled a 3–3–1 record and outscored their opponents, 66 to 64. Center Maurice Tingstad was the team captain.

Schedule

References

Western State Teachers
Western Michigan Broncos football seasons
Western State Teachers Hilltoppers football